Drescoma cinilixa is a species of snout moth in the genus Drescoma. It was described by Harrison Gray Dyar Jr. in 1914 and is known from Panama, Costa Rica and Guatemala.

References

Moths described in 1914
Phycitinae